The  Church of Our Lady of Good Hope is an historic Carpenter Gothic-style Roman Catholic  church building located on a bluff overlooking the Mackenzie River in Fort Good Hope, Northwest Territories, Canada. Only  in size, it was built between 1865 and 1885 as a mission of the Oblate Fathers. Father Émile Petitot, "renowned ethnologist, linguist and geographer of the Canadian northwest" was a resident of the mission from 1864 to 1878.

The building's simple exterior, with its wooden siding, steep pitched roof, lancet windows and lancet entranceway under a steepled bell tower, make it a rather plain example of Carpenter Gothic style architecture, which belies the extraordinary painted decoration of its interior.

The Church of Our Lady of Good Hope was designated a National Historic Site of Canada on June 6, 1977. The designation does not include the historic cemetery located to the left of the church building.

References

Roman Catholic churches in the Northwest Territories
Carpenter Gothic church buildings in Canada
National Historic Sites in the Northwest Territories
Heritage sites in the Northwest Territories
Roman Catholic Ecclesiastical Province of Grouard–McLennan
Roman Catholic churches on the National Historic Sites of Canada register
Roman Catholic churches completed in 1885
19th-century Roman Catholic church buildings in Canada